The Coventry and North Warwickshire Sports Club (CNWSC) (comprising, and formerly called, the Coventry and North Warwickshire Cricket Club (CNWCC), founded in 1851) is an amateur sports club in Coventry, England. Its 1st and 2nd cricket XIs were, as of 2014, in the Birmingham and District Premier League 2nd and 1st Divisions respectively. The cricket teams play their home games at the club's ground in Binley Road, Coventry. Collins Obuya played for the club in 2003. The England cricketer Ian Bell at one time played for the club.

The cricket ground was one of three venues historically used by Warwickshire County Cricket Club, which now plays solely at Edgbaston Cricket Ground in Birmingham.

The sports club is a members' club, in which is also open to the public and provides facilities for other sports in addition to cricket, including tennis, netball, bridge, squash, racquetball and physical fitness training. It hosts a variety of events and sessions such as private salsa classes and baby sensory, these are all bookable through their own entities .

Notable members
 Ian Bell (born 1982), England cricketer 
 John Collings, British and English bridge international 
 Martin Jones, British and English bridge international 
 Susan Norton, English bridge international and world champion 
 Gareth Roberts FRS, statistician and bridge player

See also 
 List of English cricket clubs

Further reading

References

External links 
 La Muse — French and Breton dancing held at CNWCC

English club cricket teams
Sport in Coventry
Cricket in Warwickshire
Contract bridge clubs